Heisler  is a village in central Alberta, Canada. It is located 23 km south of Daysland and 20 km north of Forestburg.

The community has the name of Martin Heisler, the original owner of the land. It is the home Canada's largest baseball glove—a sculpture and roadside attraction.

Demographics 

In the 2016 Census of Population conducted by Statistics Canada, the Village of Heisler recorded a population of 160 living in 74 of its 87 total private dwellings, a  change from its 2011 population of 151.

See also 
List of communities in Alberta
List of villages in Alberta

References

External links 

1920 establishments in Alberta
Villages in Alberta